Anubhavinchu Raja is a 2021 Indian Telugu-language romantic action comedy film written and directed by Sreenu Gavireddy and produced by Supriya Yarlagadda through Annapurna Studios and Sree Ventakeswara Cinemas. The film features Raj Tarun and Kasish Khan in lead roles. It was released on 26 November 2021.

Plot 
Raju works as a security guard in idm company along with his friend where he learns that Raju a.k.a King Kong Raju has hired goons to kill him. On asking about it, Raju a.k.a King Kong Raju, reveals that after inheriting his grandfather's wealth at a young age, lives a lavish life and becomes the village's laughing stock. On a quest to prove himself worthy of respect, things go haywire, when he decides to become the sarpanch of the village.

Cast 

 Raj Tarun as Bangarraju 'Raju'/ "King Kong Raju", a security guard works in Hyderabad had a dark secret. 
 Kasish Khan as Sruthi, an IT professional who works at a multinational corporation in Hyderabad
 Posani Krishna Murali
 Aadukalam Naren 
 Ajay
 Ravi Krishna as Rahul
 Sudharshan
 Temper Vamsi
 Aadarsh Balakrishna
 Ariyana Glory
 Chandoo Sai
 Bhupal Raju

Soundtrack

Release 
In late-October 2021, the release date of the film was announced as 26 November 2021.

Reception 
Thadhagath Pathi of The Times of India gave a rating of 2.5 out of 5 and wrote that "The songs by Gopi Sunder are catchy and few scenes even generate laughs. The film tries to be a moral lecture by showcasing the lifestyle of a young, rich guy from Godavari but the output is dull fare. Don’t expect too much if you’re watching it this weekend." Sangeetha Devi Dundoo of The Hindu opined that the film "has a sliver of a story and a messy screenplay, making it an ordeal to sit through". She felt that the lead actress's characterisation can be best described as a stereotypical "cute-but-dumb". A critic of Pinkvillarated the film 2/5 and wrote, "The film needed a zany hero, not a stock character. The comedy had to be self-deprecating, not indulgent. The film has a track where supari killers live as sleeper cells". NTV cited the film as a "below-average fare" and stated, "The commercial ingredients are half-hearted, especially because none of the situations feels refreshing. The final act is watchable because of the coming-of-age nature of the story".

References

External links 

 
Anubhavinchu Raja OTT Release Date

2021 films
2020s Telugu-language films
Films set in Hyderabad, India
Films shot in Hyderabad, India
Films set in Konaseema
Films shot in Andhra Pradesh
Films set in Andhra Pradesh
2020s masala films
Films scored by Gopi Sundar
Indian romantic action films
Indian romantic comedy films
2021 romantic comedy films
2021 action comedy films
Indian action comedy films